Choreutis pentacyba is a species of moth of the family Choreutidae. It is found in Egypt.

References

Choreutis
Endemic fauna of Egypt
Moths of Africa
Moths described in 1926